The Dominion XIII rugby league team played international fixtures against France during the 1930s, the team consisted of English-based non-British rugby league footballers from the dominions of the British Empire, e.g. Australia, and New Zealand.

Matches
During the 1930s, there was Dominion XIII's 5–8 defeat by France during the 1935–36 season at Stade Buffalo, Paris, on Sunday 26 April 1936, in front of a crowd of 12,000, and the 6–3 victory over France during the 1936–37 season at Stadium Municipal, Toulouse, on Sunday 21 March 1937, in front of a crowd of 16,000.

Players
Notable players include;
David Brown
J. Cutbush
Cec Fifield
R. Gaunt
Hector Gee
Ernest Trevor Hall
G. Harrison
Edward Holder
S. Hunt (York)
Rex K. King
Alan Logan
J. MacDonald
G. MacCrea
Ray Markham
Len Mason
Jeff Moores
George Nēpia
Charlie Seeling Jr.
Bill Shankland
Ted Spillane
J. Wilson

References

National rugby league teams
Rugby league in Australia
Rugby league in England
Rugby league in New Zealand